The Philippines competed at the 2014 Summer Youth Olympics, in Nanjing, China from 16 August to 28 August 2014.

Medalists
Competitors of the Philippines did not medal while competing for their country. However a single athlete won a gold medal competing for a mixed-NOC team.
As part the Mixed-NOC team
Medals awarded to participants of mixed-NOC participation at the 2014 Summer Youth Olympic

Archery

The Philippines managed to qualify 2 quota places for archery after their performance at the 2013 Asian Championships, 1 quota place for the boys' events and another for the girls' events.

Individual

Team

Athletics

Philippines qualified one athlete.

Qualification Legend: Q=Final A (medal); qB=Final B (non-medal); qC=Final C (non-medal)

Girls
Track & road events

Gymnastics

Artistic Gymnastics

Philippines qualified one athlete based on its performance at the 2014 Asian Artistic Gymnastics Championships.

Girls

Shooting

Philippines was given a wild card to compete.

Individual

Team

Swimming

Philippines qualified one swimmer.

Girls

Triathlon

The Philippines managed to qualify 1 quota place for Triathlon.

Individual

Relay

References

2014 in Philippine sport
Summer Youth Olympics, 2014